Rite Aid Corporation is an American drugstore chain based in Philadelphia, Pennsylvania. It was founded in 1962 in Scranton, Pennsylvania, by Alex Grass under the name Thrift D Discount Center. The company ranked No. 148 in the  Fortune 500 list of the largest United States corporations by total revenue.

Rite Aid began in 1962, opening its first store in Scranton, Pennsylvania; it was called Thrift D Discount Center. After several years of growth, Rite Aid adopted its current name and debuted as a public company in 1968. Rite Aid is publicly traded on the New York Stock Exchange under the symbol RAD.

In late 2015, Walgreens announced that it would acquire Rite Aid for $17.2 billion pending approval. However, on June 29, 2017, over fear of antitrust regulations, Walgreens Boots Alliance announced it would buy roughly half of Rite Aid's stores for $5.18 billion. On September 19, 2017, the Federal Trade Commission (FTC) approved a fourth deal agreement for Walgreens to purchase 1,932 stores from Rite Aid for $4.38 billion total.

History 

Alex Grass founded the Rite Aid chain in Scranton, Pennsylvania, in September 1962, after marrying into Harrisburg Pennsylvania's Lehrman family in the early 1950s. The first store was called Thrift D Discount Center. The store expanded into five additional states in 1965 and went public as Rite Aid in 1968. It moved to the New York Stock Exchange in 1970. Rite Aid is one of Fortune 500's Largest U.S. Corporations.

Growth and acquisitions 

Ten years after its first store opened, Rite Aid operated 267 locations in 10 states. In 1981, Rite Aid became the third-largest retail drugstore chain in the country. 1983 marked a sales milestone of $1 billion. A 420-store acquisition along the east coast expanded Rite Aid's holdings beyond 2,000 locations.

A large number of acquisitions brought the chain to the state of Michigan in 1984. These were of Grand Rapids, Michigan-based Muir Drug and Remes Drug, along with Lippert Pharmacy of Lowell and Herrlich Drug of Flint; one year later, Rite Aid opened stores in Lansing, Michigan through the acquisition of State Vitamin. Expansion into Ohio began in 1987 through the acquisition of Cleveland-based Gray Drug. Among the companies acquired was Baltimore, Maryland's Read's Drug Store. On April 10, 1989, Peoples Drug's 114 unit Lane Drug of Ohio was purchased by Rite Aid.

Rite Aid acquired twenty-four Hook's Drug Stores stores in 1994, selling nine of those stores to Perry Drug Stores, a Michigan-based pharmacy chain. One year later, Rite Aid acquired 224 stores from Perry, thus expanding its presence in Michigan even further.

In 1996, Rite Aid acquired Thrifty PayLess, a 1,000-store West Coast chain. The acquisition of Thrifty PayLess included the Northwest-based Bi-Mart membership discount stores, which was sold off in 1998. Acquisitions of Harco, Inc. and K&B, Inc. brought Rite Aid into the Gulf Coast area.

In the 1990s, Rite Aid partnered with Carl Paladino's Ellicott Development Co. to expand the company's presence in upstate New York.

On August 23, 2006, the Wall Street Journal announced that Rite Aid would acquire 1,858 Eckerd Pharmacy and Brooks Pharmacy stores from Jean Coutu for US$3.4 billion. The deal closed on June 4, 2007. Rite Aid announced that the two chains would be converted to the Rite Aid name, retiring the 109-year-old Eckerd banner. The merger was signed and completed as of June 4, 2007, with all remaining Eckerd stores converted to Rite Aid by the end of September 2007.
In 2015, Rite Aid purchased EnvisionRx, a pharmacy benefit manager, which owns subsidiary PBMs MedTrak, Connect Health Solutions, and Smith Premier Services.

Partnerships 
General Nutrition Corporation (GNC) and Rite Aid formed a partnership in January 1999, bringing GNC mini-stores within the Rite Aid pharmacies. A partnership with drugstore.com in June 1999 allowed customers of Rite Aid to place medical prescription orders online for same-day, in-store pickup.

In March 2018, Walgreens and Rite Aid agreed to a $4.3 billion deal for Walgreens to purchase 1,932 Rite Aid locations and 3 distribution centers.

Amazon announced in June 2019, that Amazon shoppers will be able to pick up their purchases at designated counters inside more than 100 Rite Aid stores across the US. The new service is called Counter and launches in the US after finding success in the UK with the Next clothing chain and in Italy with Giunti Al Punto Librerie, Fermopoint and SisalPay stores.

In May of 2022, Rite Aid partnered with Homeward, a rural home care startup. Under this partnership, Medicare-eligible customers will be directed to Homeward's clinical services and will have access to Homeward mobile care units.

Company troubles 
In the late 1990s, Rite Aid performed poorly, and its stock dropped precipitously from $30 to $4.40 At this time, Mary Sammons, of Fred Meyer, was tapped by Leonard Green, of Leonard Green & Partners to become President/COO. She went on to become CEO in 2003.

In July 2001, Rite Aid agreed to improve their pharmacy complaint process by implementing a new program to respond to consumer complaints.

On July 25, 2004, Rite Aid agreed to pay $7 million to settle allegations that the company had submitted false prescription claims to United States government health insurance programs.

In August 2007, Rite Aid acquired approximately 1,850 Brooks and Eckerd Stores throughout the United States in hopes of improving their accessibility to a wider range of consumers. On December 21, 2007, The New York Times reported that Rite Aid had record-breaking losses that year, despite the acquisition of the Brooks and Eckerd chains.
The following fiscal quarter saw an increase in revenue but a sharp fall in net income as Rite Aid began the integration process. Rite Aid shares fell over 75% between September 2007 and September 2008, closing at a low of $0.98 on September 11, 2008. Rite Aid shares subsequently dropped to $0.20 on March 6, 2009, the all-time low .

Rite Aid had a major accounting scandal that led to the departure (and subsequent jail time) of several top ranking executives, including CEO Martin Grass. After serving six years in prison, Martin Grass was released on January 18, 2010.  Founder Alex Grass died of cancer on August 27, 2009.

In June 2010, John Standley was promoted from Chief Operating Officer to chief executive officer, with former CEO Mary Sammons retaining her position as chairperson; Ken Martindale, previously co-president of Pathmark, was named Chief Operating Officer.

In October 2018, a former Rite Aid vice president of advertising and two co-owners of Nuvision Graphics Inc. pleaded guilty to in a $5.7 million kick-back scheme defrauding Rite Aid.

Surveillance practices 
In July 2020, the Reuters news agency reported that during the 2010s Rite Aid had deployed facial recognition video surveillance systems and components from FaceFirst, DeepCam LLC, and other vendors at some retail locations in the United States. Cathy Langley, Rite Aid's vice president of asset protection, used the phrase "feature matching" to refer to the systems, a technical term related to the process of image feature extraction in the field of artificial intelligence for video surveillance, and said that usage of the systems resulted in less violence and organized crime in the company's stores, while former vice president of asset protection Bob Oberosler emphasized improved safety for staff and a reduced need for the involvement of law enforcement organizations. In a 2020 statement to Reuters in response to the reporting, Rite Aid said that it had ceased using the facial recognition software and switched off the cameras.

According to director Read Hayes of the National Retail Federation Loss Prevention Research Council, which in 2018 called facial recognition technology "a promising new tool" worth evaluating, Rite Aid's surveillance program was either the largest or one of the largest programs in retail. The Home Depot, Menards, Walmart, and 7-Eleven are among other US retailers also engaged in pilot programs or deployments of facial recognition technology.

Of the stores examined by Reuters, those in communities where people of color made up the largest racial or ethnic group were three times as likely to have the technology installed, raising concerns related to the substantial history of racial segregation and racial profiling in the United States. Rite Aid said that the selection of locations was "data-driven", based on the theft histories of individual stores, local and national crime data, and site infrastructure.

Customer loyalty and rewards programs 
The wellness+ card is Rite Aid's free shopping rewards card that started nationwide on April 18, 2010. It became a part of the newly launched American Express-backed Plenti rewards program in May 2015. Rite Aid introduced wellness+ BonusCash on January 1, 2018. Customers can no longer earn Plenti points; instead, they earn BonusCash that can only be redeemed at Rite Aid. However, Rite Aid would remain a part of the Plenti rewards program, which would end on July 10, 2018.  After Plenti was discontinued Rite Aid re-introduced the wellness+ program.

Merger with Eckerd and Brooks 

On August 23, 2006, the Wall Street Journal announced that Rite Aid would be buying the Eckerd Pharmacy and Brooks Pharmacy chains (Brooks Eckerd Pharmacy) from the Quebec-based Jean Coutu Group for US$3.4 billion, and merging the two chains into one dominant pharmacy system. The company's shareholders overwhelmingly approved the merger on January 18, 2007. After some store closures and the conversion of the two chains was completed, Rite Aid became the dominant drug store retailer in the Eastern U.S., and the third largest drug retailer nationwide (behind the faster-growing Walgreens and CVS chains).

Similar to what CVS experienced in the Chicago metropolitan area after its purchase of Albertsons drug store chains, the deal gave Rite Aid stores that were too close to each other. (Only 23 stores nationally were sold to Walgreens, The Medicine Shoppe, or independent owners to meet federal regulations.) In many situations, especially in Pennsylvania, where both chains were dominant and had roots in the Commonwealth (Rite Aid originated in Scranton; Eckerd began in Erie, while Thrift Drug was popular in the Pittsburgh area), there were, in some cases, neighboring Rite Aid stores. However, in March 2008, some of these overlapping stores were closed. Most of these stores that closed were pre-existing Rite Aids from before the Eckerd deal, since Eckerd had built newer, more modern stores with drive-through pharmacies and larger space under ownership of both JCPenney and Jean Coutu Group; and the "moved to" sites were converted Eckerds. Employees at the closed stores were transferred to nearby ones, so no layoffs were necessary.

Rite Aid had sold some stores to JCPenney's Thrift Drug chain in the mid-1990s shortly before JCPenney's acquisition of Eckerd and had also sold all of their Massachusetts stores to Brooks in 1995, bringing some existing Eckerd and Brooks stores that were once Rite Aids full circle.

Because Eckerd was previously owned by JCPenney, Eckerd stores accepted JCPenney charge cards. Since the merger, all Rite Aids take JCPenney charge cards, a policy also followed by competitor CVS pharmacy, which had earlier acquired most of the Eckerd chain in the southeastern United States.

With the acquisition of Brooks Eckerd, at its peak in 2008, Rite Aid had a total of 5,059 stores and employed 112,800 people.

Market exits 
On January 4, 2008, Rite Aid Corporation announced that it would terminate operation of its 28 Rite Aid stores in the Las Vegas, Nevada, area and had signed an agreement to sell patient prescription files from that metro market to Walgreens. The company said Las Vegas was a non-core market that had not been contributing to overall results, and it had not opened a new store there since 1999. One Nevada store would remain open in Gardnerville, near the California border, where Rite Aid at the time had more than 600 stores.

On February 5, 2009, Rite Aid announced that it would terminate operations of seven Rite Aid stores in San Francisco, along with five stores in eastern Idaho through a sale to Walgreens.

Rite Aid formerly had a presence in the Columbus, Ohio market, but has since sold off its stores there to CVS.

Sale of stores to Walgreens

On October 27, 2015, Walgreens announced that it would acquire Rite Aid for $9.4 billion, pending regulatory and shareholder approval. The deal would have resulted in a merger of two of the United States' three largest pharmacy chains. Walgreens planned to keep the Rite Aid name on existing stores when the deal went through, though the long-term plans for the Rite Aid name were unknown. On December 21, 2016, it was announced that Fred's would acquire 865 Rite Aid stores as a result of the merger for $950 million, for antitrust reasons. In January 2017, Rite Aid and Walgreens cut the price of the merger to approximately $6.8 billion and delayed the merger by six months. On January 31, 2017, it was reported that the workers' union 1199SEIU United Healthcare Workers East, representing 6,000 Rite Aid Corp workers, was opposed to the sale of the Rite Aid stores to Fred's Inc.

On June 29, 2017, Walgreens announced the merger was canceled, adding that it would be purchasing 2,186 stores from Rite Aid for $5.2 billion plus a $325 million penalty for canceling. Most experts had thought that the merger would be completed within a few weeks. The merger would have had about 46% of the market share. The revised deal—now not including Fred's at all—effectively would have seen Rite Aid exit the southeastern United States.

On September 19, 2017, the Federal Trade Commission (FTC) approved a fourth deal agreement, this time allowing Walgreens to purchase only 1,932 Rite-Aid stores for $4.38 billion. The sale was completed on March 27, 2018. Three distribution centers and related inventory were transferred after September 1, 2018, when the stores were rebranded to Walgreens. The 1,932 stores showed banners saying "Pharmacy now operated by Walgreens" or "We now have a Walgreens pharmacy" in the meantime. After the acquisition, Walgreens closed about 600 stores over 18 months starting in spring 2018, mostly Rite Aid stores within a mile of an existing Walgreens.

As of fiscal year 2022, Pennsylvania with 494 stores is home to the largest number of Rite Aids, followed by California and New York with 487 and 281 respectively.

Attempted acquisition by Albertsons 
On February 20, 2018, Albertsons announced plans to acquire the remainder of Rite Aid, including the 2,600 stores not acquired by Walgreens, in a merger of equals, subject to shareholder and regulatory approval. On August 8, 2018, Rite Aid announced that the plan had failed to please shareholders and the proposed acquisition would be cancelled.

Acquisition of Bartell Drugs
In October 2020, Rite Aid announced the acquisition of the privately held Bartell Drugs, a 67-location Seattle-area chain, for $95 million. Some customers have criticized the acquisition with reports of heavy staff turnover and computer system glitches.

Finances

For the second quarter of 2019, Rite Aid reported basic and diluted earnings of -0.34 per share. This is significantly down from prior quarters' report of .20 per share.

Litigation

Hall v. Rite Aid Corporation 
In the employee seating lawsuit (Hall v. Rite Aid Corporation, San Diego County Superior Court), the parties reached a class action settlement for $18 million plus institution of a two-year pilot seating program for front-end checkstands.  On September 14, 2018, the Court granted preliminary approval of the settlement.  On November 16, 2018, the court granted final approval of the settlement.

In re National Prescription Opiate Litigation 
As reported by Rite Aid, the company is a defendant in the consolidated multidistrict litigation proceeding, In re National Prescription Opiate Litigation, pending in the U.S. District Court for the Northern District of Ohio. Various plaintiffs (such as counties, cities, hospitals, and third-party payors) allege claims concerning the impacts of widespread opioid abuse against defendants along the pharmaceutical supply chain, including manufacturers, wholesale distributors, and retail pharmacy chains.

Byron Stafford v. Rite Aid Corp. and Robert Josten v. Rite Aid Corp. 
As reported by Rite Aid, the company is involved in two consumer class action lawsuits in the United States District Court for the Southern District of California, alleging that it has overcharged customers' insurance companies for prescription drug purchases, resulting in overpayment of co-pays.

References

External links 

 Rite Aid Official website
 

 
Pharmacies of the United States
Companies based in Cumberland County, Pennsylvania
Companies based in Philadelphia
American companies established in 1962
Retail companies established in 1962
Health care companies established in 1962
1962 establishments in Pennsylvania
Companies listed on the New York Stock Exchange
Health care companies based in Pennsylvania
1960s initial public offerings